The Ponte di San Francesco (Italian for Bridge of Saint Francis) is a medieval segmental arch bridge over the Aniene in Subiaco, Lazio, Italy. Constructed in 1358, its single span measures .

Other notable historic bridges crossing the Aniene include the ancient Ponte Nomentano and Ponte Salario, both of which were also fortified with a tower.

References

External links 

Il Ponte di S. Francesco at Tibursuperbum 
Ponte di San Francesco at the Municipality of Subiaco homepage 

Buildings and structures completed in 1358
Bridges completed in the 14th century
Ponte San Francesco
San Francesco
Deck arch bridges
Stone bridges in Italy
Transport in Lazio